Tarar Khal (also spelled Tarar Khel, Tararkhel and Tararkhal) is a Tehsil and tourist attraction (Banjusa lake, diyar) in Sudhanoti District of Pakistan-protected Azad Kashmir, which is disputed with India. It is the headquarters of Tehsil Tarar Khal.

A rest house of the Pakistan Public Works Department exists here for tourists stay at. All the basic necessities of life are available in town.
Tararkhal has one hospital which is brand new. It was officially opened on 16 September 2020 by the Sajjada Nasheen of Nerian Sharif, Sultan ul Arifeen Siddiqui Al-Azhari(son of  Muhammad Alauddin Siddiqui Nerian Sharif).

Nearest famous landmarks
Nearest famous places and landmarks includes Mohiuddin Hospital, Mohi Uddin Islamic University Nerian Sharif  and shrines of Ghulam Mohiudin Ghaznavi , Pir Durab (known as Pir Sani lasani) and Muhammad Alauddin Siddiqui, also known as Dabar-e-aalia Nerian Shareef. It has various tourists attraction places in surroundings like Grattapaar Waterfall, place named diyaaar where multiple di yaar trees seem to look as when.

References

Populated places in Sudhanoti District
Tehsils of Sudhanoti District